is a Japanese manga series written and illustrated by Shinichi Sugimura. It was serialized in Shogakukan's seinen manga magazine Big Comic Superior from January to August 2020, with its chapters collected in two tankōbon volumes.

Publication
Shogakukan collected its chapters in two tankōbon volumes, released on July 30 and November 30, 2020.

Volume list

Reception
The series has been recommended by manga artists Naoki Urasawa and Taro Nogizaka. Saigo no Yūransen ranked eighth on "The Best Manga 2021 Kono Manga wo Yome!" ranking by Freestyle magazine.

References

External links
 

Romance anime and manga
Seinen manga
Shogakukan manga